Tähdet ja avaruus is a Finnish science magazine which publishes recent developments, news and interviews in astronomy, space technology, cosmology and amateur astronomy. It is the largest circulation astronomy magazine in Scandinavia.  

Tähdet ja avaruus is a member magazine of the Ursa Astronomical Association and it can also be subscribed without a membership. Ursa Astronomical Association is a non profit organization which promotes astronomy and related sciences and astronomy school education. 

The editor in chief of the magazine is Marko Pekkola, editor is Laura Koponen, staff science writers are Sakari Nummila and Anne Liljeström. Layout is by Heikki Laurila. A group of free science journalists assist the magazine. Many Finnish astronomers answer the readers questions in the questions and answers column.

References

External links
Official website

1971 establishments in Finland
Eight times annually magazines
Finnish-language magazines
Magazines established in 1971
Magazines published in Helsinki
Science and technology magazines